"Faith, Hope & Trick" is the third episode of season three of the television show Buffy the Vampire Slayer. This episode introduces the character Faith, another vampire slayer, who will become a key player in Sunnydale. While the rest of the gang gets to know Faith, Giles suspects that Faith and Buffy aren't being entirely honest about recent events in their lives. Some new vampires arrive in Sunnydale with their own agendas and a familiar face returns.  It was written by David Greenwalt, directed by James A. Contner, and first broadcast on October 13, 1998.

Plot 
Kakistos and his colleague, Mr. Trick arrive in town, discussing how they will kill the slayer. Having been overruled by the school board, Principal Snyder reluctantly allows Buffy to return to the school on the condition that she make up for the classes she missed. Buffy and Willow go to the library, where Giles questions Buffy about what happened the night she killed Angel and defeated Acathla, ostensibly to help him with a binding spell to prevent the demon from being resurrected.

That night at the Bronze, fellow student Scott Hope attempts to talk to Buffy, but she becomes distracted by a suspected vampire leading a girl outside. Buffy and the rest of the group watch as the girl kills the vampire. The girl introduces herself as Faith, a new vampire slayer. Cordelia realizes that the death of Kendra the Vampire Slayer must have summoned Faith. The group and Buffy's mother Joyce take a liking to Faith, but Buffy remains skeptical. Kakistos and Trick plot revenge on Faith for mutilating Kakistos' face.

That night, while the slayers are patrolling together, they are attacked by vampires. While Buffy struggles with several vampires, Faith focuses only on one, beating the vampire repeatedly instead of helping Buffy. Giles tells Buffy the vampires were working for Kakistos, an ancient vampire with cloven hands and feet. After leaving the library, Buffy runs into Scott, who tries to ask her out on a date. Buffy accepts, but she runs away very disturbed when Scott hands her a Claddagh ring like the one Angel gave her. Giles tells Buffy that Faith's watcher is dead, not at a retreat center as Faith had said.

Buffy goes to see Faith at her motel room and tells her Kakistos is in town. Faith tells Buffy that Kakistos murdered her watcher some weeks earlier in Boston and he swore revenge on her for mutilating him with an axe. As Faith tries to leave, Kakistos and a group of vampires break into the room. Buffy and Faith escape through a window, but are driven into Kakistos' lair. Buffy fights and slays many of the vampires while Kakistos attacks Faith. Eventually, Faith impales Kakistos with a large beam, killing him. Trick flees with another vampire.

Inspired by Faith standing up to her fears and conquering them, Buffy finally reveals to Giles and Willow that Angel was cured when she killed him. Although she is skeptical that the information will help with a binding spell, Buffy feels better for having told them. After Buffy leaves, Willow approaches Giles to offer her help with the spell, but Giles tells her that there is no spell, he wanted Buffy to open up about what happened between her and Angel.

Buffy talks to Scott and, after explaining her reaction to the ring, they make plans to go out. She returns to the mansion where she killed Angel. Buffy places her Claddagh ring on the ground and says goodbye. After she leaves, the ring starts to vibrate and Angel returns from hell.

Writing
"Faith, Hope, & Trick" introduces the minor character Mr. Trick. After Principal Robin Wood and Kendra, he is the longest-running character of color in the series, with 5 appearances. According to Elyce Rae Helford, in an unusually long speech for such a minor character, he "overtly clarifies the racial metaphor underlying the show's narrative by comparing African Americans in Washington, D.C., with vampires in Sunnydale and by conceiving both as equivalent examples of 'darkness.

References

External links 

 

Buffy the Vampire Slayer (season 3) episodes
1998 American television episodes
Television episodes written by David Greenwalt